The 1992 Pontins Professional was the nineteenth edition of the professional invitational snooker tournament which took place between 9 and 16 May 1992 at Pontin's in Prestatyn, Wales.

The tournament featured eight professional players. The quarter-final matches were contested over the best of 9 frames, the semi-final matches over the best of 11 frames, and the final over the best of 17 frames.

Steve James won the event for the first time, beating Neal Foulds 9–8 in the final.

Main draw

References

Pontins Professional
Snooker competitions in Wales
Pontins Professional
Pontins Professional
Pontins Professional